The Sernftal tramway (SeTB) was an electrical narrow-gauge tramway  in the Swiss canton of Glarus, which was operated by a private company. The line linked Schwanden railway station, on the Weesen to Linthal railway line, with communities in the valley of the Sernf river including Engi, Matt and Elm, where the line terminated. The line served a total of 13 stations, and its depot was situated at Engi-Vorderdorf, at roughly the half-way point of the line.

In 1879, the valley of the Linth river was connected to the Swiss railway network by the opening of the Weesen to Linthal line, but the side-valley of the Sernf river remained unserved. This impacted the local economy, and various proposals were brought forward to provide rail service to the Sernf valley. The eventual result was the Sernftal tramway, which opened on 8 June 1905.

The line was largely constructed immediately alongside the road, with some narrow street running sections through the villages. The line was constructed to metre gauge ( gauge), and was electrified using direct current (first 750, then 800 V) generated from the line's own hydro-electric power plants and diesel engine generators.

The line closed on 31 May 1969. Although the line closed, the operating company survived, changing its name to Autobetrieb Sernftal AG. This company still operates the bus service that replaced the railway, as well as several other bus services in the area, under the name Sernftalbus.

Some rolling stock from the line still exists. One four-wheeled motor coach of 1928 (BDe 2/2 4) is preserved at the Blonay–Chamby museum railway, as is a trailer (B2 13) and a freight car (K31), both of 1905. The three more modern bogie railcars of 1949 (BDe 4/4 5-7) were sold to the Aigle–Ollon–Monthey–Champéry railway when the Sernftal line closed, and then resold in 1985 to Stern & Hafferl in Austria for use on their Vöcklamarkt to Attersee line. One of the cars (variously reported as 6 or 7) was destroyed in a fire in 1987, but the other two remain in use. It is expected that they will be retired in 2016, and a preservation society, the Verein Sernftalbahn, is campaigning for their return. The same society runs a museum, including two further freight cars from the line (K35 and K36), at Engi-Vorderdorf.

The railcar BDe 4/4 6 has been relocated to the Verein Sernftalbahn's museum in October, 2016.

References

External links 
 
 Verein Sernftalbahn web site
 Swisstopo map showing route of line in 1944 and today

Metre gauge railways in Switzerland
Closed railway lines in Switzerland
BC